Coma Berenices or Com is a dwarf spheroidal galaxy situated in the Coma Berenices constellation and discovered in 2006 in data obtained by the Sloan Digital Sky Survey. The galaxy is located at the distance of about 44 kpc from the Sun and moves away from the Sun with the velocity of about 98 km/s. It is classified as a dwarf spheroidal galaxy (dSph) meaning that it has an elliptical (ratio of axes ~ 5:3) shape with the half-light radius of about 70 pc.

Com is one of the smallest and faintest satellites of the Milky Way—its integrated luminosity is about  times that of the Sun (absolute visible magnitude of about −4.1), which is much lower than the luminosity of the majority of globular clusters. However, its mass is about 1.2 million solar masses, which means that galaxy's mass to light ratio is around 450. A high mass to light ratio implies that Com is dominated by the dark matter.

The stellar population of Com consists mainly of old stars formed more than 12 billion years ago. The stars of Com  were probably among the first stars to form in the Universe and currently there is no star formation in Com. The measurements have so far failed to detect any neutral hydrogen in it—the upper limit is only 46 solar masses.

Coma Dwarf is located near the Sagittarius Stream, which is made of stars stripped from the Sagittarius Dwarf Elliptical Galaxy. This association may indicate that Com is a former satellite of star cluster from that galaxy.

Notes

References

Dwarf spheroidal galaxies
Coma Berenices
Local Group
Milky Way Subgroup
4713557
?